The  was a government department of the Republic of Venice responsible for upholding the Republic's sumptuary laws.

History
This office was short-lived, however, and after its abolition the tasks were again distributed to various other magistracies, including the Procurators of Saint Mark.

In 1559, they were joined by two , elected by the Venetian Senate, and three years later an assistant  was named, and the board given the right to legislate on the topic, a power previously held by the Senate. In 1635 four assistant  were appointed temporarily for the revision of the legislation, which had become too complex, and again three in 1644, for the same purpose.

As the  frequently intervened in the 's sentences, in 1652 a special board of seven nobles was established to examine them.

From its heyday in the 17th century, the  lost its importance in the 18th century. It passed its last laws in 1749, and thereafter continued to exist by force of tradition, busying itself with minor tasks such as decoration of the city or fire-fighting.

References

Sources
 

Government of the Republic of Venice
Legal history of Italy
Prohibitionism
1514 establishments in Italy
16th-century establishments in the Republic of Venice